Obeyesekere may refer to:

Donald Obeyesekere (1888–1964), colonial era legislator of Ceylon
Forester Augustus Obeysekera (1880-1961), colonial era legislator of Ceylon
Gananath Obeyesekere, Emeritus Professor of Anthropology at Princeton University
James Peter Obeyesekere II (1879–1968), Head Mudaliyar
James Peter Obeyesekere III (1915–2007), Sri Lankan politician
Solomon Christoffel Obeyesekere (1848–1927), colonial era legislator of Ceylon